Khlong Luang is a district (amphoe) in Pathum Thani province, central Thailand.

History
Originally, the area was part of the Bang Wai District, controlled by Mueang Thanyaburi. In the Ayutthaya era, this area was lowland deep forest. In 1767 when the Ayutthaya Kingdom was destroyed by Burmese troops, some of the survivors moved to this area.

When the community became bigger, people expanded agriculture until it was close to Thung Luang (now Thanyaburi district). King Rama V ordered a canal, Khlong Rangsit, to be built for agricultural purposes for the people in the Thung Luang and Bang Wai area. When the canal was finished, the government changed the name of the district to Khlong Luang to commemorate King Rama V's foresight.

Geography
Neighboring districts are (from the north clockwise): Bang Pa-in and Wang Noi of Phra Nakhon Si Ayutthaya province; Nong Suea, Thanyaburi, Mueang Pathum Thani, and Sam Khok of Pathum Thani Province.

Administration
The district is divided into seven sub-districts (tambons), which are further subdivided into 106 villages (mubans). The Thai names of the tambon simply mean 'Canal One' to 'Canal Seven'. There are two towns (thesaban mueangs), Khlong Luang and Tha Khlong, both incorporating parts of tambons Klong Nueng and Khlong Song. The remaining five tambons are each administered by a tambon administrative organization (TAO).

Places
 Wat Phra Dhammakaya
 Thailand Science Park
 Asian Institute of Technology
 Thammasat University, Rangsit Campus
 Thammasat University Hospital
 Thammasat Stadium
 Bangkok University, Rangsit Campus
 Rajamangala University of Technology Thanyaburi
 Rama IX Museum

References

Khlong Luang